Dallas Woodrow Taylor Jr. (April 7, 1948 – January 18, 2015) was an American session drummer who played drums on several rock albums throughout the 1960s and 1970s.

Life and career 

Taylor was born in Denver but grew up in San Antonio, Texas. He achieved some success with psychedelic rock band Clear Light in the late 1960s, but is best remembered as the drummer on Crosby, Stills and Nash's debut album, and their follow-up with Neil Young, Déjà Vu (1970), and was given a front-sleeve credit along with Motown bassist Greg Reeves.

As well as appearing on Stephen Stills's eponymous first solo album in 1970, his 1971 follow up Stephen Stills 2, and the supporting tour with the Memphis Horns, Taylor was the drummer for Stills's group Manassas in 1972 and 1973. He also appeared on Stills's 1975 solo album Stills. In 1974 he played with Van Morrison at the 1974 Montreux Jazz Festival in a quartet along with keyboardist Pete Wingfield and bassist Jerome Rimson, a performance issued on the 2006 DVD, Live at Montreux 1980/1974. He briefly appeared again in the mid 1970s, drumming for Paul Butterfield's touring band.

He also appeared on Graham Nash's 1971 debut Songs For Beginners, and played percussion on the Byrds, 1973 reunion album Byrds, further connecting him to CSNY.

Taylor died on January 18, 2015, of complications from viral pneumonia and kidney disease, aged 66.

Discography 
 Clear Light
 Crosby, Stills & Nash
 John B. Sebastian
 Deja Vu
 Stephen Stills
The Four of Us
 Ohio Knox
 Songs For Beginners
 Stephen Stills 2
 Windmills
 Manassas
 Byrds
 Down The Road
 Monkey Grip
 Stills
 Stone Alone
 Nine on a Ten Scale
 Primordial Lovers

References 

1948 births
2015 deaths
Musicians from Denver
American rock drummers
Burials at Holy Cross Cemetery, Culver City
Crosby, Stills, Nash & Young
American session musicians
Musicians from Los Angeles
Liver transplant recipients
Deaths from kidney disease
Deaths from pneumonia in California